René Rodrigues Simões (born December 17, 1952) is a Brazilian retired professional football manager.

Coaching career 
Born in Rio de Janeiro, he guided Jamaica national team to the World Cup in France in 1998. This was Jamaica's first, and to date, only appearance in the final stages of a World Cup, as well as making Jamaica the first English speaking Caribbean country to qualify for the World Cup. His squad was made up of a few English players of Jamaican parentage, and they were dubbed 'The Reggae Boyz' in the English media.

In the 2004 Summer Olympics, he won the silver medal with the Brazil women's national team. He has also previously coached Trinidad and Tobago. In 2006, he was the head coach and manager of Iran U-23 national team. In 2007 Simões then returned to Brazil to coach Série B Coritiba, where he won the second division. He left Coritiba in November 2008 to accept the position as Jamaica's Technical Director for the 2010 World Cup qualifying campaign. On September 11, 2008 Renê Simões was fired by the Jamaica Football Federation after just nine months in charge due to the country's poor performance in World Cup qualifiers. On October 2, 2008, he was appointed to manage Fluminense and was released on 6 March 2009. Simões then returned to Coritiba at the start of the 2009 Brasileiro but was released after four months, when the club fell to the relegation zone. He then moved to Serie B Portuguesa in São Paulo but Simões resigned in August 2009 after only two weeks as coach of second-division Portuguesa in Brazil, after saying armed men threatened the players in the locker room after a loss. He was appointed as the head coach of the Costa Rica national team on September 16, 2009 after former coach Rodrigo Kenton was sacked due to poor performance in the World Cup Qualifiers for South Africa 2010.

On December 20, 2009, Ceará officially signed Simões as the club's new manager, substituting Gusmao who didn't renew with the Brazilian club.

On July 31, 2010, he was announced as the new manager of Atlético Goianiense.

On April 10, 2011, he was announced as the new manager of Bahia.

On February 16, 2012, Simões became director of youth academy of São Paulo. In Cotia, city where the academy is localized, he created the Padrão São Paulo de Qualidade, that tries to improve the footballers formation into the club. On November 7, 2012, however, Simões left this employ.

After a long time away from football, Simões made his return as the coach of Botafogo for the 2015 season.

Coaching honors
1988 South American Youth Championship with Brazil national under-20 football team
1990 Qatari League with Al-Rayyan Sports Club
1990 Sheikh Jassem Cup with Al-Rayyan Sports Club
1997 Jamaica qualified for the 1998 World Cup
1998 Jamaica came 4th in the Gold Cup
1998 Jamaica won the Caribbean Cup
2004 Athens Olympics Silver Medal with Brazil women's national football team
2006 Asian Games Bronze medal with Iran national under-23 football team
2007 Coritiba - Campeonato Brasileiro Série B (Brazilian league second division) champion

References

External links
 
 BBC FIFA World Cup 1998 Profile : Rene Simoes
 Nacion.com

1952 births
Living people
Sportspeople from Rio de Janeiro (city)
Brazilian football managers
Serrano Football Club managers
Olaria Atlético Clube managers
Fluminense FC managers
Qadsia SC managers
Mesquita Futebol Clube managers
Associação Portuguesa de Desportos managers
Vitória S.C. managers
Brazil national under-17 football team managers
Brazil national under-20 football team managers
Esporte Clube Bahia managers
Al-Rayyan SC managers
Associação Ferroviária de Esportes managers
Associação Atlética Ponte Preta managers
Al-Arabi SC (Qatar) managers
Jamaica national football team managers
Trinidad and Tobago national football team managers
Honduras national football team managers
Al-Khor SC managers
Brazil women's national football team managers
Esporte Clube Vitória managers
Santa Cruz Futebol Clube managers
Vila Nova Futebol Clube managers
Coritiba Foot Ball Club managers
Ceará Sporting Club managers
Costa Rica national football team managers
Atlético Clube Goianiense managers
Grêmio Barueri Futebol managers
Botafogo de Futebol e Regatas managers
Figueirense FC managers
Campeonato Brasileiro Série A managers
Campeonato Brasileiro Série B managers
Campeonato Brasileiro Série C managers
Campeonato Brasileiro Série D managers
Qatar Stars League managers
Primeira Liga managers
1998 FIFA World Cup managers
Brazilian expatriate football managers
Brazilian expatriate sportspeople in Qatar
Brazilian expatriate sportspeople in Portugal
Brazilian expatriate sportspeople in Jamaica
Brazilian expatriate sportspeople in Trinidad and Tobago
Brazilian expatriate sportspeople in Honduras
Brazilian expatriate sportspeople in Costa Rica
Expatriate football managers in Qatar
Expatriate football managers in Portugal
Expatriate football managers in Jamaica
Expatriate football managers in Trinidad and Tobago
Expatriate football managers in Honduras
Expatriate football managers in Costa Rica